Domènec Batet i Mestres (Tarragona, August 30, 1872 – Burgos, February 18, 1937) was a Spanish military man who became general of the Spanish Army.

Starting as a lieutenant, Batet quickly escalated ranks during the Cuban War of Independence. After the Disaster of Annual, as a colonel, Batet took part in the investigation of the defeat taking part in the drafting of the Picasso Files. During the Second Spanish Republic, Domènec Batet was designated chief of the IV Organic Division in Catalonia and crushed the Catalan Uprising of October the 6th. With the outbreak of the Spanish Civil War Batet remained loyal to the Republic and was deployed in Burgos, where his subordinates betrayed him and captured him for the Nationalists. After months of captivity, Franco ordered the execution of Batet.

Biography

Early military career 

Domènec Batet i Mestres started his career in the Spanish Army as a volunteer lieutenant in the Cuban War of Independence. During the war, he received decorations and was promoted multiple times. He also developed a pacifist ideology.

After that, during the Rif War, as a colonel he was one of the instruction judges who wrote the Picasso Files, a report directed by Juan Picasso González that pointed out the corruption of the African deployed Spanish officers, including Francisco Franco.

The Catalan uprising 

Shortly after the proclamation of the Second Spanish Republic, Domènec Betet was deployed in Catalonia as chief of the IV Organic Division. In that position Batet was always deferent with the Generalitat of Catalonia, treated well the soldiers and promoted the use of the Catalan between them.

In 1932, Batet led the repression of the general strike of the Alt Llobregat. Instead of using terror tactics, ordered by Manuel Azaña, he acted quickly and avoided unnecessary bloodshed.

Its most important action during the Republican years was the successfully suffocation of the Events of October the 6th, a Catalan attempt of secession. The uprising was fuelled by multiple issues, the most important: the inclusion of anti-republican ministers of the CEDA, a right wing Spanish political party that won the 1933 elections, and the cancellation of the Law of Contracts of Cultivation (Llei de Contractes de Conreu). This law was approved by the government of Lluís Companys and later on banned by the Spanish government, arguing that it exceeded the Statute of Autonomy of Catalonia of 1932. The Law of Contracts of Cultivation protected the peasants and when the Spanish government banned it infuriated the Catalan working class.

On 5 October 1934 a general strike collapsed several cities of Spain. The following day, Lluís Companys decided to declare the Catalan Republic and numerous heavily armed squads occupied the streets of Barcelona and other towns, supporting the initiative and capturing public offices. Lluís Companys also telephoned Domènec Batet, asking for support, but Batet remained loyal to the central government and gained some time demanding a written request. While Companys wrote the request, Batet prepared the Army, Guardia Civil, and Guardia de Asalto troops and directly attacked the Palau de la Generalitat de Catalunya. He was able to avoid any big confrontation with the revolted militias and Mossos d'Esquadra, because they were ordered not to attack until they were told so. Batet managed to surround the building, breaking the Catalan government chain of command, and shoot multiple warning shots with a howitzer. After 10 hours, and isolated from the militiamen and Mossos d'Esquadra, that had no orders, Lluís Companys was forced to surrender.

Acting efficiently, Batet minimised the casualties and used the minimal force to fulfil the Spanish government orders. Some sources say that in order to avoid further fights against his own people Batet asked to be redeployed somewhere else while others claim that he was ordered to change of position as a punishment for his passivity during the confrontation. In any case, Niceto Alcalá-Zamora transferred him to Burgos.

Spanish Civil War and execution 

On June 13, 1936 Batet was transferred to the Organic Division of Burgos, where the general Emilio Mola, leader of the Nationalist faction, was also deployed. When the Spanish Civil War started, Batet was betrayed by his own men and they imprisoned him. While Mola, who respected Batet as a military man, was the leader of the Nationalists, Batet was kept in prison. When Franco became the Generalissimo of the Nationalist forces he ordered the execution of  Batet, according to leftist sources, in retaliation for the Picasso Files, where Batet accused Franco of corruption during the Rif War.

References

Bibliography

See also 
 Francesc Macià
 Mossos d'Esquadra
 Juan Prim y Prats

1872 births
1937 deaths
People from Tarragona
Spanish generals
Politicians from Catalonia
Soldiers from Catalonia
Military personnel from Catalonia
Laureate Cross of Saint Ferdinand
People executed by Spain by firing squad
Victims of the White Terror (Spain)